Natsuhiko (written: 夏彦) is a masculine Japanese given name. Notable people with the name include:

, Japanese writer
, Japanese footballer

Fictional characters
, a character in the manga series Eyeshield 21

Japanese masculine given names